Ministry of Local Governments was a former government ministry of Turkey. 

The municipalities and the other local offices such as province governorships of Turkey are in the responsibility of the Minister of Interior. During the formation of the 42nd government of Turkey on 5 January 1978, the Ministry of the Local Governments was established for the coordination of the local governments.  But it was a short-lived ministry and during the formation of the 43rd government of Turkey on the 12 November 1979, it  was abolished and the responsibility of the local governments was retransferred to the Ministry of Interior.

Minister

References

1978 establishments in Turkey
1979 disestablishments in Turkey
Local Governments
Ministries established in 1978
Ministries disestablished in 1979
Local government ministries